Allan Youngson (born 29 September 1984), is a former professional footballer who has played in the Scottish Premier League for Dundee. He is currently the co-manager of Dyce Juniors in the Scottish Junior Football Association, North Region.

Career
Youngson joined Dundee after a time in the youth system at Chelsea, and made his debut for the club in the Scottish Premier League against Hibernian in May 2004. A spell in the Scottish Football League with Peterhead was followed by stints in the Highland Football League and North Superleague with Inverurie Loco Works and Culter respectively.

Youngson ended his playing career with a short spell at Dyce Juniors and he rejoined the club as co-manager with Ritchie Clark in December 2018.

References

External links

Living people
1984 births
Scottish footballers
Dundee F.C. players
Peterhead F.C. players
Inverurie Loco Works F.C. players
Culter F.C. players
Dyce Juniors F.C. players
Scottish Premier League players
Scottish Football League players
Scottish Junior Football Association players
Scottish football managers
Association football midfielders
Scottish Junior Football Association managers